CTA International is an equal-shares joint venture company between defence companies Nexter and BAE Systems. CTAI is based in Bourges, France, and has been established to develop and manufacture case telescoped weapons and ammunition. The company name is an acronym for Case Telescoped Ammunition. Its main product is a 40mm cannon for light armoured vehicles.

Timeline
 1994 - CTAI was created by (at that time) GIAT and Royal Ordnance, with initial activities around a 45mm solution
 1997 - the 40mm calibre solution is selected
 1999 - The UK MoD Operational Analysis (OA) study output is shared with US DoD; the solution is integrated into Bradley Fighting Vehicle and the US-UK Tracer prototype vehicle
 2002 - Further UK MoD & DGA OA studies; risk reduction contract awarded
 2004 - UK MoD & DGA contract to integrate 40CT into the MTIP and unmanned Toutatis turrets
 March 2008 - UK MoD select CT40 as a mandated item for Warrior IFV and FRES-Scout (now Ajax) programmes
  April 2017: France orders the first tranche of the EBRC Jaguar
 26th November 2021 : British MoD receives the 515 and last 40CT cannon ordered.

CTAS40 cannon

The Case Telescoped Armament System (CTAS40) autocannon is designed to fire 40mm telescoped  ammunition. This format provides significant benefit within vehicles in the space envelope required for the gun and the ammunition storage. However, the selection of the unfielded new design for major programmes has been controversial.

The CT40 40mm cannon has been ordered by the French Army for use on its future armoured reconnaissance vehicle EBRC Jaguar. It has also been mandated for the UK Ajax (formerly FRES SV) and (cancelled) Warrior Capability Sustainment Programme (WCSP) programmes. 

In February 2010 CTAI signed a £11m contract with the French and British defence ministries to qualify the CTWS, including environmental testing and the firing of 15,000 rounds.

The company has confirmed that the ammunition for the British weapons will be assembled at BAE Systems' ROF Glascoed facility.

Nexter/Thales RAPIDfire
This is a naval variant of the CTAS gun also 40mm, it can fire the A3B rounds and will be fitted on the Bâtiment ravitailleur de forces of the French Navy. The first guns of the type were installed on the lead ship of the Bâtiment ravitailleur de forces class, Jacques Chevallier, in February 2023.

Ammunition
The CTAS40's proprietary 40mm telescoped ammunition is manufactured for various applications, including anti-infantry and anti-materiel. The variants differ in weight, effective range, and payload depending on the intended target.

Users 

 : EBRC Jaguar
 : Ajax, Warrior
 : EBRC Jaguar

References

External links
 "CTAi web site" - CTA International

BAE Systems joint ventures
Nexter Systems
Defence companies of France
40 mm artillery
Companies based in Centre-Val de Loire